"Poetry in Motion" is a UK No. 1 hit single in 1961, recorded amongst others by Johnny Tillotson. Tillotson's version was the most successful.

Background
The song was written by Paul Kaufman (1930–1999) and Mike Anthony (born 1930), who said that the inspiration for it came from looking up from their work and seeing a procession of young ladies from a nearby school pass by on the sidewalk outside each afternoon. Bill Porter supervised the recording session in Nashville, Tennessee, which featured saxophonist Boots Randolph, pianist Floyd Cramer and bassist Floyd "Lightning" Chance. An alternative version, with King Curtis on saxophone, was recorded some weeks earlier and published by Bear Family Records in 2011.

In the US Billboard Hot 100, "Poetry in Motion" peaked at No. 2 in November 1960, kept out of the No. 1 spot by "Georgia on My Mind" by Ray Charles.  In the UK Singles Chart it hit No. 1 in January 1961, and also made the charts on reissue in 1979.

Chart positions

Cover versions
"Poetry in Motion" was also recorded by Bobby Vee on his 1961 album Bobby Vee 
Another version was recorded by Chilean singer Pat Henry.  
There was another cover version made titled "Pejskové se koušou" ("Dogs Bite Each Other") by the Czech singer Marie Pojkarová.
The song was covered by Swedish pop group Ola & the Janglers in 1966 and went to No. 1 in the Swedish voted chart "Tio i Topp" but only reached No. 7 in the sales chart "Kvällstoppen".
The song was covered by Mud in 1982.
Ralf Arnie wrote German lyrics. Entitled "Deine roten Lippen" it was recorded by Gerd Böttcher and released on single in 1960.
The song was covered by honeyhoney in season 1, episode 5 of the anthology comedy series The Guest Book
In 1977, a Finnish band called Kontra covered the song in Finnish titled as "Mainoksennus" in their debut album "Ei kontrollia" (Love Records LRLP 258).

See also
List of number-one singles from the 1960s (UK)

References

1960 singles
UK Singles Chart number-one singles
Johnny Tillotson songs
1960 songs
Cadence Records singles
London Records singles